Thymallus ligericus, the Loire grayling, is a European freshwater fish species in the salmon family  Salmonidae.  The species is endemic to the upper Loire drainage in France, where it lives in medium to large foothill, canyon and plateau rivers of the mountainous regions.

The Loire grayling was separated as a species distinct from the more widespread European grayling, Thymallus thymallus, in 2019. It is morphologically distinguished  from that species by a more elongated body, by its pointed snout (with a straight or convex snout profile vs a concave profile of T.  thymallus), a more inferior mouth, a high number of black dots on the sides, a shorter head and a shorter horizontal eye diameter. It can also be distinguished by molecular characters.

References

ligericus
Freshwater fish of Europe
Fish described in 2019